The Canton of Crocq  is a former canton situated in the Creuse département and in the Limousin region of central France. It was disbanded following the French canton reorganisation which came into effect in March 2015. It consisted of 14 communes, which joined the canton of Auzances in 2015. It had 2,903 inhabitants (2012).

Geography 
A farming area, with the town of Crocq, in the arrondissement of Aubusson, at its centre.

The canton comprised 14 communes:

Basville
Crocq
Flayat
La Mazière-aux-Bons-Hommes
Mérinchal
Pontcharraud
Saint-Agnant-près-Crocq
Saint-Bard
Saint-Georges-Nigremont
Saint-Maurice-près-Crocq
Saint-Oradoux-près-Crocq
Saint-Pardoux-d'Arnet
La Villeneuve
La Villetelle

Population

See also 
 Arrondissements of the Creuse department
 Cantons of the Creuse department
 Communes of the Creuse department

References

Crocq
2015 disestablishments in France
States and territories disestablished in 2015